Darryl Johnson Jr. (born April 4, 1997) is an American football outside linebacker for the Seattle Seahawks of the National Football League (NFL). He played college football at North Carolina A&T.

Early life and college career
Johnson grew up in Kingsland, Georgia. He committed to play college football at North Carolina A&T, which was the only school that gave him an offer following an injury during his high school senior year. In his final year with the Aggies, he racked up 55 total tackles (19 for a loss) and 10.5 sacks, earning the Mid-Eastern Athletic Conference defensive player of the year award. Johnson declared for the NFL draft following his redshirt junior year.

Professional career

Buffalo Bills
Johnson was selected by the Buffalo Bills with the 225th overall pick in the seventh round of the 2019 NFL Draft.

Carolina Panthers
On August 30, 2021, the Bills traded Johnson to the Carolina Panthers for a 2022 sixth round pick. He was placed on injured reserve on October 30, 2021 with a hamstring injury. He was activated on December 7.

On August 30, 2022, Johnson was waived by the Panthers.

Seattle Seahawks
On August 31, 2022, Johnson was claimed off waivers by the Seattle Seahawks. He suffered a foot injury in Week 4 and placed on injured reserve on October 7.

References

External links
North Carolina A&T Aggies bio

1997 births
Living people
American football defensive ends
Carolina Panthers players
North Carolina A&T Aggies football players
People from Kingsland, Georgia
Players of American football from Georgia (U.S. state)
Seattle Seahawks players